Hugh Pyle (born 21 September 1988 in Sydney) is a rugby union footballer.   His regular playing position is lock.   He previously represented the Rebels in Super Rugby making his franchise debut in Round 3 of the 2011 Super Rugby season against the Chiefs.

At the conclusion of the 2014 Super Rugby season he departed Australia to take up a lucrative opportunity with major French rugby club (Stade français Paris rugby).

External links 
Rebels profile

Living people
1988 births
Australian rugby union players
Rugby union locks
Melbourne Rebels players
Rugby union players from Sydney
People educated at Barker College
Stade Français players
Aviron Bayonnais players
Australian expatriate rugby union players
Expatriate rugby union players in France
Australian expatriate sportspeople in France
Australian expatriate sportspeople in Japan
Expatriate rugby union players in Japan
Toshiba Brave Lupus Tokyo players